DW Practice, LLC is an Atlanta-based provider of information technology services. The company offers services related to enterprise data management,  application development, product engineering, QA and testing and managed services. DW Practice has offices and "solution delivery centers" across the US and India. Data warehousing and business intelligence, application development, big data, cloud computing and mobile technologies are the key focus areas for DW Practice. The company has strategic partnerships with IBM, Microsoft, and Oracle.

Services
DW Practice's core service offerings include:
 Enterprise Data Management  
 Enterprise Application Management
 QA and Testing
 Product Engineering
 Managed Services

Technology solutions
 Data Warehousing and Business Intelligence
 Big Data
 Cloud Computing
 Mobility 
 Microsoft Solutions
 IBM Solutions
 Oracle Solutions

Global locations

 USA – Atlanta (GA), Glendale (CA), Princeton (NJ)
 India – Hyderabad, Bangalore

References 

Outsourcing companies
Companies based in Atlanta
Organizations based in Atlanta